Benny Creek is a stream in the U.S. state of Arizona. It is a tributary of Hall Creek.

Benny Creek has the name of Benny Howell, an early settler.

See also
List of rivers of Arizona

References

Rivers of Apache County, Arizona
Rivers of Arizona